The Cleveland mayoral election of 1965 saw the reelection of Ralph S. Locher by an extremely narrow margin.

General election

References

Mayoral elections in Cleveland
Cleveland mayoral
Cleveland
November 1965 events in the United States
1960s in Cleveland